Kenny Heatly (born March 28, 1982) is a former American and Canadian football cornerback. He was signed as an undrafted free agent by the Detroit Lions in 2004. He played college football at Bethune-Cookman.

Heatly also played for the Toronto Argonauts.

External links

just Sports Stats

1982 births
Living people
Players of Canadian football from St. Petersburg, Florida
Canadian football defensive backs
Detroit Lions players
Toronto Argonauts players
American players of Canadian football
Players of American football from St. Petersburg, Florida
Bethune–Cookman Wildcats football players